The Brandenburg football championship (German: Brandenburgische Fußball-Meisterschaft) was the name of highest association football competition in the Prussian Province of Brandenburg, including Berlin, established in 1898. The competition was organized by various regional football associations between 1898 and 1933. The last incarnation of the competition was the VBB-Oberliga. The competition was disbanded in 1933 with the rise of the Nazis to power.

Overview
German football was, from its beginnings, divided into regional associations, which carried out their own championship, which often pre-dated the national German championship. With the interception of the later in 1903, the former became qualifying tournaments for it but these regional championships still held a high value for the local clubs. These regional championships were:
 Southern German football championship – formed in 1898
 Brandenburg football championship – formed in 1898
 Central German football championship – formed in 1902
 Western German football championship – formed in 1903
 March football championship – existed from 1903 to 1911
 Northern German football championship – formed in 1906
 South Eastern German football championship – formed in 1906
 Baltic football championship – formed in 1908

All this regional championships were suspended with the rise of the Nazis to power in 1933. At the end of the Second World War, some resumed, now in league format. Others completely disappeared, like the Baltic championship, as the territories they were held in were not part of Germany any more. With the South West German football championship, a new regional competition also appeared in 1945. Ultimately, with the formation of the Fußball-Bundesliga in 1963, all this regional championships ceased altogether.

History

Background

The Prussian province of Brandenburg was largely identical to what is now the federal state of Brandenburg, except for the areas east of the Oder-Neisse line, which are now part of Poland. Berlin was separated politically from the province in 1881 and significantly enlarged in size through the Greater Berlin Act of 1920. Clubs from city of Berlin were part of, and indeed, dominated the Brandenburg football championship. The outcome of the First World War and change of Prussia to a Free State had little influence on the competition as, unlike other regions of Germany, Brandenburg did not lose any territory.

Early Berlin-Brandenburg football associations
In the late 1890s, a number of local football associations were formed in the Berlin and Brandenburg region, most of them short lived. In the earliest days of football in the country, Berlin was the center of growth of the sport and some of the champions of these associations held themselves to be "national champions" before the formation of the DFB (Deutscher Fußball Bund, en: German Football Association) and the emergence of a widely recognized German championship in the early 1900s. In 1933, associations throughout the country, including those in Berlin, were disbanded under the Nazi regime and reorganized into 16 regional leagues, or Gauligen, playing for a single national championship. Separate workers' and faith-based competitions active in Berlin were also absorbed into the new leagues.

The Verband Deutscher Ballspielvereine, a Berlin-based association of German football clubs was formed on 11 September 1897. In May 1902, it was renamed as the Verband Berliner Ballspielvereine to reflect its geographical alignment.

From 1903 to 1911, the Märkischer Fußball-Bund, named after the Mittelmark, existed in parallel with the Verband Berliner Ballspielvereine and both sent their champions to the German football championship. In April 1911, the two associations merged to form the Verband Brandenburgischer Ballspielvereine.

In 1933, after the rise of the Nazis to power, the Verband Brandenburgischer Ballspielvereine was disbanded, like all other regional football associations in Germany.

Competition

1898–1911 
The Brandenburg football championship was first played in 1898, when eight clubs competed in a league format for it. The number of games played by each team varied greatly but the top four clubs each played nine season games with the top three ending up on equal points. To determine the champion, a two leg decider was played between Britannia Berlin and BFC Preussen with the former winning both games and earning its first league title. In its second edition, only six clubs participated, all from the city of Berlin and this time each club played an equal number of games. Because of the top two teams finishing on equal points, a final had to be played once more, this time BFC Preussen coming out the winner.

Expanded to nine clubs for 1900, the league champion won the Brandenburg title outright at this edition, BFC Preussen winning all of its 16 games. The following season, only seven clubs took part in the competition but for 1902 it was expanded to twelve teams in two divisions of six, with the two divisional winners playing out the Brandenburg champions. The finals were held in a two leg format but because each team won one game, a third match had to be held to decide the winner. For 1903, the league returned to a single division format, now with eight clubs. Additionally, the league received some local competition with the March football championship being introduced, organised by the rival Märkischer Fußball-Bund. Also, the German football championship was held for the first time, with the Brandenburg champion, Britannia Berlin, losing 1–3 against VfB Leipzig, who went on to win the title.

Unchanged in format and modus, the league winner was once more Britannia Berlin with the club reaching the final of the German championship, too. Because of a protest by the Karlsruher FV, who had lost 1–6 to Britannia in the first round in Berlin and rightfully claimed all games were supposed to be staged on neutral ground, the final in Kassel was canceled hours before the game.

In 1905, the Union 92 Berlin took out the title in a competition that remained otherwise unchanged from the previous two seasons and then went on to become the first club from Berlin to win a German championship, beating Karlsruher FV in the final. The 1906 edition saw BFC Hertha 92, the later Hertha BSC, win the league and become one of three Berlin clubs in the German finals, alongside defending champions Union 92 and the March league winner SV Norden-Nordwest, without any of the three making it to the final.

In 1907, the league winners of the Verband Berliner Ballspielvereine and the Märkischer Fußball-Bund agreed on playing a one-off final for an overall Berlin championship, which BFC Viktoria 1889 won. Viktoria then went on to reach the German final but lost to southern champions Freiburger FC. The following year saw almost a complete repeat but this time Viktoria won the German final, beating Stuttgarter Kickers 3–0.

The 1909 season saw an expansion of the league to nine clubs and a refusal of the Verband Berliner Ballspielvereine to stage a Berlin final for financial reasons; it did not want the Märkischer Fußball-Bund to profit financially from the games. Because of this, both league champions were allowed at the German finals but Viktoria lost 2–4 to Phönix Karlsruhe in the final game. In 1910, the two rival leagues continued their stand-off and the March champion, SC Tasmania 1900 Berlin, actually reached the semi-finals of the national championship while BFC Preussen was knocked out in the first round.

The 1911 season was the last of the split, the situation remaining unchanged during the season and Viktoria taking out the Brandenburg and German title. At the end of it, the two associations merged and formed the Verband Brandenburgischer Ballspielvereine.

1911–1924 
With only one football association in the region, made up of two leagues, the Brandenburg championship was staged in 1912 in two divisions of ten clubs each with a two-leg final between the league winners at the end. In the final years before the First World War the Brandenburg champions could not reach a German final again and from 1914 to 1920, the German championship was suspended in any case. On local level, the league returned to a single division of ten clubs in 1913 and kept this format until 1917.

In 1918 and 1919, the league was expanded to 18 clubs, an extraordinary number in German football in those days when most leagues were at a strength of ten to twelve teams. Brandenburg did not, unlike most other German regions, interrupt play during the war and continued its competition. The 1920 season was an oddity, only half completed when Union Oberschöneweide was declared the winner.

The 1921 edition saw a return to a more common format with two divisions of six clubs each, with a two-leg final at the end. Brandenburg champion Vorwärts Berlin reached the German final, losing 0–5 to 1. FC Nürnberg. The two division were expanded to eleven clubs in one and ten in the other for 1922 and, with Union Potsdam, contained a club from outside of Greater Berlin for the first time. For 1923, both divisions operated on a strength of ten clubs, now renamed Oberliga Berlin-Brandenburg, and champions Union Oberschöneweide reached the national final, losing 0–3 to Hamburger SV. After an unchanged 1924 season, from 1925 onwards the league saw the rise of Hertha BSC as a dominating team in Brandenburg and Germany.

1925–1933 
Hertha BSC was to win the league seven consecutive times from 1925 to 1931, the last four of those by beating Tennis Borussia Berlin in the final, laying the foundations to a still existing rivalry. While the club bowed out of the German finals in the semi-finals of 1925 against FSV Frankfurt, losing 0–1 in extra time, it also dominated German football in this era, to a lesser extent. Hertha reached the final of every German championship from 1926 to 1931, losing in 1926, 1927, 1928 and 1929, to SpVgg Fürth, 1. FC Nürnberg, Hamburger SV and Fürth again.

From 1925, an expanded finals round also meant that Brandenburg was allowed to send the championship finalist to the national title games as well. The Brandenburg championship was again split into two divisions of ten teams from 1926, with finals at the end, a format it maintained until 1933. From 1931, the Pommeranian champions, previously part of the Baltic football championship, took part in a four-team final round that also included the Berlin Cup winner.

After four unsuccessful attempts, Hertha finally won a national title in 1930, beating Holstein Kiel 5–4 in the final. The season after, it repeated this achievement by beating TSV 1860 Munich 3–2.

The 1932 season saw the end of Hertha's seven-year run; the club came second in its division and missed out on taking part in the Brandenburg finals. This title was won by Tennis Borussia Berlin, for the first time after four unsuccessful attempts in series; but Eintracht Frankfurt stopped TB in the quarter finals of the national title games.

The last Brandenburg championship in 1933 was won by Hertha BSC once more, but the club's golden age had gone and it made a first-round exit to SV Hindenburg Allenstein at the national finals.

Aftermath 
The Brandenburg championship was replaced with the Gauliga Berlin-Brandenburg by the Nazis in 1933, one of 16 new tier-one football leagues in the country. In the era that followed, the clubs from Brandenburg had little success and none ever reached a German championship final again until the introduction of the Fußball-Bundesliga in 1963, which did away with the finals games altogether.

A competition similar to the Brandenburg football championship never reformed. After the end of the Second World War, Germany remained divided until 1991 and the former clubs of this competition played in separate countries. Clubs from both parts of Berlin played in the same competition, the Oberliga Berlin until 1950, but it did not include clubs from the rest of Brandenburg. After the reunion, the clubs from what was East Germany joined the united German football league system, but a competition that only includes clubs from Brandenburg and Berlin was not recreated.

Brandenburg football champions 
German champions in Bold:

 1 Club from the rival Märkischer Fußball-Bund league.

March Football Championship 
The championship of the Märkischer Fußball-Bund was held from 1903 to 1911, resulting in the following champions:

Finals 
The Brandenburg championship was not always decided by a final. In some seasons, a final was necessary because two clubs finished on equal points at the top of the table. In two seasons, a final was played against the winner of a rival competition. In most cases where a final was played, it was when the league was split into two divisions and the division winners played for the Brandenburg championship.

Further reading
 Stürmen für Deutschland: Die Geschichte des deutschen Fußballs von 1933, publisher: Campus Verlag

References

Sources
 Fussball-Jahrbuch Deutschland  (8 vol.), Tables and results of the German tier-one leagues 1919–33, publisher: DSFS
 Kicker Almanach,  The yearbook on German football from Bundesliga to Oberliga, since 1937, published by the Kicker Sports Magazine

External links
  The Gauligas Das Deutsche Fussball Archiv 
  German league tables 1892–1933 Hirschi's Fussball seiten
 Germany – Championships 1902–1945 at RSSSF.com

Defunct football competitions in Germany
German football championship
1898 establishments in Germany
1933 disestablishments in Germany
Football competitions in Berlin
Football competitions in Brandenburg
Football competitions in Pomerania